Alysson Marendaz Marins (born May 26, 1976), known as just Alysson, is a Brazilian football player.

Career 
As a journeyman, Alysson Marendaz Marins has played for CR Vasco da Gama, on loan for Serrano Football Club, CFZ do Rio, AIK Fotboll, Kalmar FF and OFK Ostersund in Sweden, Perak FA in Malaysia, and Chinese Super League club Beijing Guoan. He played for CFZ-Imbituba (SC), Ex.Imbituba Futebol Clube. In 2010 Alysson signed a contract with Avai-SC.

References

External links 
 Personal website

1976 births
Living people
Association football forwards
CR Vasco da Gama players
Kalmar FF players
Brazilian expatriate sportspeople in China
Beijing Guoan F.C. players
Chinese Super League players
Avaí FC players
Perak F.C. players
Expatriate footballers in Malaysia
Brazilian expatriate footballers
Expatriate footballers in Sweden
Brazilian expatriate sportspeople in Malaysia
Expatriate footballers in China
Brazilian expatriate sportspeople in Sweden
Östersunds FK players
Footballers from Rio de Janeiro (city)
Brazilian footballers